Linnea Dale (born 22 April 1991) is a Norwegian singer.

Early life
Linnea Dale was born in Tinn, Telemark, Norway. She attended the high school Skien videregående skole.

Idol
She was a contestant on the fifth season of the Norwegian Idol series in 2007, finishing in seventh place. She performed "What Do I Know About Love", a song written by herself, in the semi-finals on 10 October. She has qualified for the Norwegian final.

Musical career
In 2009, Dale collaborated with the Drammen band Donkeyboy on their debut album Caught in a Life, providing guest vocals on the songs "Ambitions", "Sometimes", and "Awake". "Ambitions" debuted on the Norwegian singles chart at number seven on 6 April 2009, and reached the number one spot on 29 June, after 13 weeks on the charts. She also recorded the song "Anything Goes (and Everything's Alright)" with Magnus Sinnes.

Her first EP, Children Of The Sun, was released 27 January 2012 on Warner Music. Her first solo album, Lemoyne Street, was released in April 2012, with help from producer Øystein Greni and Nikolai Eilertsen from Bigbang.

Dale competed in Melodi Grand Prix 2014, the Norwegian competition to find their representative in the Eurovision Song Contest 2014. She competed with her song "High Hopes" and came second in the gold final.

Her album Good Goodbyes was released on 9 May 2014. Pal Waaktaar, from a-ha, co-wrote and produced three songs.

In 2019 she collaborated with the Norwegian pop band Minor Majority on their album Napkin Poetry, providing guest vocals on the song "Another Year".

Discography
Albums
2012: Lemoyne Street
2014: Good Goodbyes
2018: Wait For The Morning
EPs
2012: Children of the Sun

References

External links
Linnea Dale at MySpace

1991 births
Living people
People from Tinn
Idol (Norwegian TV series) participants
English-language singers from Norway
Melodi Grand Prix contestants
21st-century Norwegian singers
21st-century Norwegian women singers